Leonardo Aurellio Randy Fitzpatrick is an American actor and co-director of the Marlborough Chelsea gallery. He is best known as Telly in Kids (1995) and Johnny Weeks in The Wire (2002–2004).

Career 
He was discovered at age 14 by director Larry Clark skateboarding at Washington Square Park in New York City. Fitzpatrick was trying to perform certain skating tricks, and every time he was unsuccessful, he would scream and curse. Clark later cast him as Telly, the central character in the film Kids, then a supporting role in Bully.

He has appeared in numerous films since his work with Clark, including Storytelling and City of Ghosts. After finishing Storytelling, he was cast in the Robert Redford vehicle The Last Castle (2001). Two days before filming was to begin, he was hit by a drunk driver, suffering severe nerve and muscle damage in his leg which left him unable to walk for a month, and he was dropped from the film.

In 2000, he appeared in Bam Margera's CKY2K, and in CKY3 the following year. From 2002 to 2004, he had a recurring role as drug addict Johnny Weeks in the ensemble cast of the HBO series The Wire. Following this he had a string of guest roles on television series including My Name Is Earl (a recurring role), Carnivale, Law & Order: Criminal Intent, Sons of Anarchy, and Broad City.

In 2013, he had a supporting role in the film Cold Comes the Night starring Bryan Cranston.

Personal life 
Fitzpatrick has been in a relationship with creative director Chrissie Miller since 2008. Their first child, named Otis Miller, was born in 2016. The couple were married on March 3, 2018 in New York City.

Filmography

Film

Music videos

Television

References

External links

Year of birth missing (living people)
Living people
American male film actors
American male television actors
Male actors from New Jersey
People from West Orange, New Jersey
20th-century American male actors
21st-century American male actors